LadyLuck is the third album by Maria Taylor, originally released on March 31, 2009. The album features the song "Cartoons and Forever Plans," co-written by and including guest vocals from R.E.M.'s Michael Stipe. LadyLuck reached number 48 on Billboard's "Heatseakers" charts. KCRW DJ Gary Calamar ranked "Time Lapse Lifeline" as number one, in his top 10 songs of 2009.  "Time Lapse Lifeline" was featured in the 24th episode of the fourth season of the FOX show Bones ("The Beaver in the Otter"). The album was re-released on Taylor's own label, Flower Moon Records in 2016.

Track listing

"LadyLuck" – 3:14
"Time Lapse Lifeline" – 4:00
"It's Time" – 3:43
"My Favorite Love" – 3:24
"100,000 Times" – 3:43
"Green Butterfly" – 4:12
"Broad Daylight" – 5:11
"A Chance" – 3:19
"Orchids" – 3:34
"Cartoons and Forever Plans" (feat. Michael Stipe) – 2:55

Personnel
 Maria Taylor - Composer, Drums, Guitar (Acoustic), Guitar (Classical), Keyboards, Piano, Primary Artist, Vocals
 Andy LeMaster- Bass, Composer, Engineer, Guitar, Guitar (Electric), Mellotron, Mixing, Organ, Percussion, Producer, Vocals
 Mike Mogis - Bass, Chimes, Engineer, Guitar, Guitar (Electric), Instrumentation, Mixing, Pedal Steel, Percussion, Producer, Vibraphone
 Nate Walcott - String Arrangements, Woodwind Arrangement
 Michael Stipe - Composer, Vocals
 Ian Aeillo - Guitar (Electric), Hook
 Lukas Burton - Producer
 Louis Schefano - Composer
 Danny Kalb - Engineer, Producer
 Stephen Marsh - Mastering
 Craig Ryer - Composer, Keyboards, Vocals
 Michael Shackelford - Drums, Guitar, Vocals
 McKenzie Smith - Drums, Percussion
 Macey Taylor Jr. Bass, Guitar (Classical), Mellotron, Vocals
 Jonathan Wilson - Drums
 Autumn de Wilde - Photography

References

Maria Taylor albums
2009 albums
Nettwerk Records albums